Catherine Tallon-Baudry is a CNRS senior researcher and group leader working at the Ecole Normale Supérieure Paris.

Biography 
Tallon-Baudry completed her PhD at the Claude Bernard University Lyon 1 in 1997 working with Olivier Bertrand. In 1998 she started as a Marie Curie research fellow in the lab of Andreas Kreiter at the University of Bremen in Germany. In 2002 she won the young researcher award from the Fyssen foundation and started working at the Pitié-Salpêtrière Hospital in Paris. In 2012 she started her own group at the Cognitive Sciences department of the Ecole Normale Supérieure, and in 2014 was the recipient of a European Research Council advanced grant.  Tallon-Baudry is a fellow of the Canadian Institute for Advanced Research and associate editor for the journal Neuroscience of Consciousness.

Research 
Tallon-Baudry is an electrophysiologist working on the topics of visual consciousness and brain body interactions. Her PhD thesis focused on the role of gamma oscillations on visual integration. She works in the field of induced gamma-band oscillations and visual consciousness. Her work uses a combination of EEG and MEG in healthy participants, intracranial recordings in epileptic patients, and behavioural experimentation methods. Her more recent work focuses on the relationship between signals arising in the viscera, brain dynamics, and cognition.

Awards and honors 
 Marie Curie fellowship
 Fyssen foundation young researcher award
 ERC Advanced Grant
 CNRS silver medal

References

External links 

Website 

Living people
20th-century French women scientists
Electrophysiologists
Year of birth missing (living people)
Place of birth missing (living people)
French National Centre for Scientific Research scientists